Avanhandava is an H chondrite meteorite that fell to earth in 1952 in São Paulo, Brazil.

Classification
It is classified as H4-ordinary chondrite.

References

Bibliography
Paar W. et al. 1976. Revista Brasileira de Geo-ciencias 6: 201–210.
Kletetschka G. et al. 2003. Meteoritics & Planetary Science 38: 399–405.
Kohout T. et al. 2004. Physics and Chemistry of the Earth 29: 885–897.
Lee M. R. and Bland P. A. 2004. Geochimica et Cosmochimica Acta 68: 893–916.
Terho M. et al. 1993. Studia Geopgysica et Geodaetica 37: 65–82.

See also 
 Collection of meteorites in the National Museum of Brazil
 Glossary of meteoritics
 Meteorite falls
 Ordinary chondrite

Meteorites found in Brazil
National Museum of Brazil
1952 in Brazil